St. Andrew Cathedral is a Ukrainian Orthodox cathedral at 15100 New Hampshire Avenue in Silver Spring, Maryland, United States. It is the seat of the Archbishop of New York-Washington.

History
St. Andrew’s Parish was founded with a membership of 65 families in the Washington, D.C. area in 1949.  The community initially met in rented buildings until it bought and renovated a structure on 16th Street. The congregation purchased the property in Silver Spring in 1986 and commissioned a church building in the Kozak Baroque style. That same year the nuclear disaster at Chernobyl occurred and the church was dedicated in memory of the victims. The church building was finished the following year and it was consecrated on April 24, 1988. It features a mosaic of its patron, St. Andrew, above the entrance on the street façade and five cupolas with gilt Onion domes.

References

External links

Cathedral Web Site
Diocesan Web Site

Christianity in Silver Spring, Maryland
Christian organizations established in 1949
Churches completed in 1987
Cathedrals in Maryland
Colesville, Maryland
Ukrainian Orthodox Church of the USA church buildings
Eastern Orthodox churches in Maryland
Andrew
Ukrainian-American culture in Maryland
1949 establishments in Maryland
Buildings and structures in Silver Spring, Maryland